Octafluorocubane or perfluorocubane is an organofluorine compound with the formula , consisting of eight carbon atoms joined into a cube, with a fluorine bonded to each carbon corner. It is a colorless, sublimable solid at room temperature. It has been of longstanding theoretical interest, but was not synthesised until 2022, when it was prepared in several steps from a cubane carboxylic ester beginning with its heptafluorination. According to X-ray crystallography, the C-C distances (1.572 Å) in octafluorocubane are identical in length to those in the parent cubane.

Octafluorocubane has attracted interest from theorists because of its unusual electronic structure, which is indicated by its susceptibility to undergo reduction to a detectable anion , with the free electron trapped inside of the cube.

The compound was voted "favorite molecule of 2022" by readers of Chemical & Engineering News.

References 

Fluorocarbons
Molecular geometry
Theoretical chemistry
Cyclobutanes
Pentacyclic compounds